Juan Antonio Román Castillo (born 18 September 1943) is a Spanish retired footballer who played as a winger, and a current manager.

References

External links

1943 births
Living people
Footballers from Almería
Spanish footballers
Association football wingers
La Liga players
Segunda División players
Cádiz CF B players
Granada CF footballers
Sevilla FC players
Real Valladolid players
UD Salamanca players
FC Cartagena footballers
Spanish football managers
Segunda División B managers
Tercera División managers
UD Almería managers
Polideportivo Ejido managers
CP Almería managers